Ghullam Hyder Mehjoor (born 23 February 1941) is a Sindhi historian, sufi, poet, artist, former Teacher, musician, educationist, politician, and journalist from Pakistan. Born in Naushehro Feroze district, Sindh he has written three books including "Daga achu monkhy Dah Han(Come Bull hit me), “History of Rajput Solangi(Solanki)" and "Kashkol e Mehjoor".

Early life and education 
He was born in a small village "Murad Solangi" near Dalipota, Sindh. According to his biography He was cared for by his mother and came to "Thatt Solangi" an ancient village in central Sindh. He is currently living in Moro. At first he passed Sindhi, Urdu final examinations. Then he passed Elementary drawing examinations and when he was in sixth class English he passed his teacher's interview and was appointed primary Head master at  "Attar khan Marri" village. He passed his English final in 1960, matric private in 1962. From 1963 to 64 He passed F.A.C and B.A Sindhi from SV training course Collage Mithiani.

As a teacher 
During duty he grew students interests in gardening and Scouting, like H.M Khawaja a late Sindhi Educationist. He taught students to recite the national anthem in rhythm as a better way to give respect to national flag. He made students confident to participate in debates, taking part in sports and  big stage speeches. which were being presented by multiple school head masters and education officers. His high interests were to manage parks, making world maps with cement in good locations of school, decorate classrooms with pretty drawings, farm flowers in part time. He did his duty in branch middle schools almost half of his life. He retired after doing duty twenty years and three months.

Political life 
From his student life Mehjoor has been active in national and parliamentary politics. In 1988 he was an independent candidate at PS-7 Nawashah (now Shaheed Benezirabad) against two heavy weight politicians of that time one of them was Abdul Haq Bhurt former provincial anti-corruption minister. And second was Ghullam Mustafa Jatoi who had become an acting prime minister at that time. His election symbol was "Scissor" because in election symbols cicle and other labour representing symbols were not contained which he had wished. His election campaign was done alone by his self on a Bicycle with pamphlets which an advance and strange election campaign from any politician at that time. Although he got not too much success but his propose was to reduce the afraid of landlords from farmers and lower-class people in which he succeeded.

As an artist 
Beyond his educational profession, Mehjoor possesses many arts as a good litraturist, Musician and an artist. His artistic ability is being seen and admired in schools in the shape of maps and drawing skills. he is a good musician also. Mostly he sings his own poetry and melodies with Harmonium like master chander. He motivated students to love nature and music. His son Shamsheer Hyder has sung songs in PTV's Sindhi telecast "Roshan Tara Programe" during his student life. An album of Mehjoor's Sufi Songs contained has released.

Migration to Moro 
In 1990 He faced a home robbery in which his villager was involved that incident forced him to leave his village and he had to migrate to Moro city where his is currently living. Even that migration was proved not good for him, he was become weak by socially, politically, economically and personally. For that he could not give his children a better education. Now most of his children are workers.

Religion 
He was a sunni Muslim in his early life but then he converted to Shia sect. Nowadays he is called by people a Sufi preacher, who advises people to love whole humanity and all creatures.

Literary work 
His three books have published yet include "Daga achu monkhy dah han (Come Bull Hit me)", History of Rajput Solangi (Solanki) and Kashkol e Mehjoor (poetry).

Reaction of people about his book 
In 2012 He faced a negative extremism for his book about Solangi clan history. He was called a strict racicst by many Sindhi writers even his book was a highly research work about Solangi clan and Sindh Studies in which he has tried to fight the case of Solangi clan which are dominated by Afghan, Iranian and Arab invaders. In this book he claims that modern Pakistan is loosely based upon "Ancient Indus valley civilization(Now Sindh)" So the real and older inhabitants should be givin respected. Although any written article or other research work challenging his book is still not published by any historian or writer yet.

References 

1941 births
Living people
Pakistani historians
Pakistani journalists